Lekh Tandon (13 February 1929 – 15 October 2017) was an Indian filmmaker and actor. He had directed numerous Bollywood movies and Indian TV Serials. He gained national fame due to success of his directorial ventures Professor (1962 film), Prince (1969 film), Ek Baar Kaho  and Agar Tum Na Hote. His films Amrapali starring Vyjanthimala and Agar Tum Na Hote with Rajesh Khanna in the lead role are considered as 
classics.  Later after 2000, he had acted in movies such as Swades, Rang De Basanti,  Chennai Express and Chaarfutiya Chhokare. He was the brother of Urdu playwright Yograj Tandon.

Biography
Lekh's father, Faqeer Chand Tandon, had studied with Prithviraj Kapoor at Khalsa High School (Lyallpur, Punjab, British India), and had been friends. Kapoor inspired Lekh to work in Bollywood. Around same time, Lekh's brother Yograj was working as assistant director and secretary to Kapoor.

Lekh started as Assistant Director in Hindi movie industry in 1950s and became a director of several hit movies beginning with Professor (1962 film). Though the prestigious film Jhuk Gaya Aasman starring Rajendra Kumar and Saira Bano did not become successful at box office, they are considered classics. His successful directorial ventures at box office include Prince (1969 film), Ek Baar Kaho, Agar Tum Na Hote. His most talked about film remains Agar Tum Na Hote starring Rajesh Khanna in the main lead. Dulhan Wahi Jo Piya Man Bhaye was one of his biggest hits and the film's heroine Rameshwari told The Times of India that Tandon was involved in every aspect of the film. She also said that the film was released without any publicity. Actor Victor Banerjee, who played the leading role in his film, Doosri Dulhan, described him as a director who "loved his craft and could deftly weave the commercial angle in a decently-told narrative." For this film Khanna received Best Actor award and Tandon received Best director award at Filmfans Association Awards in 1983. Then he moved on to nascent TV scene and started directing TV serials. His first offering was Phir Wahi Talash on India's National Television Channel Doordarshan. Lekh is credited with discovering Shahrukh Khan by casting him in his TV serial Dil Dariya.  Lekh is also  discovering Lankesh Bhardwaj by appoint him  as an assistant in Writing  with him in the year 2001  and give  him an opportunity  as an actor in Ek Aangan Ho Gaye Doh. He also directed TV serial Farmaan, broadcast on Doordarshan in early 1990s.

Awards and recognition
He shared the 1978 Filmfare Best Screenplay Award for his movie, Dulhan Wahi Jo Piya Man Bhaye, with Vrajendra Gaur and Madhusudan Kalekar.
 His biopic, Amrapali starring Vyjayanthimala and Sunil Dutt, was India's submission to the 39th Academy Awards for the Best Foreign Language Film
He received the Best Director Award for his film Agar Tum Na Hote starring Rajesh Khanna in Filmfans Association of India in 1983.

Filmography

As director
Phir Ussi Mod Par (2018)
Bikhari Aas  Nikhari Preet 
Ek Angan Ke Ho Gaye Do  - with Avinash, Lankesh Bhardwaj "Dev" and ors.
Daraar
Milan 
Adhikar 
Kahan Se Kahan Tak
Jeena Nahi Bin Tere
Do Rahain (1997)
Uttarayan (1985)
Agar Tum Na Hote (1983)
Doosri Dulhan (1983)
Khuda Kasam (1981)
Sharada (1981)
Ek Baar Kaho (1980)
Dulhan Wahi Jo Piya Man Bhaaye (1977)
Andolan (1975)
Jahan Pyar Mile (1969)
Prince (1969)
Jhuk Gaya Aasman (1968)
Amrapali (1966)
Professor (1962)
Shokhiyan (1951) as Assistant Director
Bawre Nain (1950) as Assistant Director 
Neki Aur Badi (1949) as Assistant Director 
Aag (1948 film), as Assistant Camera Man

As TV director
Dil Dariya (1988-1989)
Phir Wahi Talash (1989-1990)
Doosra Keval (1989) (DD1)
Farmaan (1994)
Ladai 
Pyale Mein Toofan
Adhikar (1996-1999) (Zee TV)
Yarana (Dubai Television)
Aisa Des Hai Mera (2006)

As actor 

 Swades (2004) - Dadaji (Village Chief)
 Paheli - Wise Man
 Rang De Basanti - Daljeet "DJ's" Grandfather
 Halla Bol - Lekh Tandon
 Chaarfutiya Chhokare - Kailash 
 Chennai Express (2013) - Bhishambhar Mithaiwala (Rahul's grandfather)

References

External links

 Official Website

1929 births
2017 deaths
Filmfare Awards winners
Hindi-language film directors
20th-century Indian film directors
Indian television directors
Film directors from Lahore
Film directors from Mumbai